Kirkwood railway station is located in the Kirkwood area of Coatbridge, Scotland. Train services are provided by ScotRail.
The station was opened by British Rail in 1993, and is virtually on the site of the old Woodside Steel and Iron Works. It is located some 250m west of the previous Langloan station, which was opened by the Rutherglen and Coatbridge Railway in August 1866 and closed when passenger trains over the line were withdrawn on 7 November 1966.

Services 

A half-hourly service operates between Glasgow Central and  stations, on Mondays to Saturdays. This formerly ran to/from Central High Level and was DMU operated, but now runs to  via the Argyle Line.  Alternate services continue south of Whifflet through to Motherwell.

Sunday services previously only ran for the month prior to Christmas and were extended to Shotts.  However, since the December 2014 timetable change, they now run throughout the year.  An hourly service runs in each direction, to Motherwell and  via Glasgow Central Low Level.

References

External links 

Railway stations in North Lanarkshire
Railway stations opened by British Rail
Railway stations in Great Britain opened in 1993
Railway stations served by ScotRail
Coatbridge